Ishmael Addo (born 30 July 1978) is a Ghanaian former professional footballer who played as a striker. He is best known for his accomplishments during his career at Ghanaian side Hearts of Oak, but has also spent several years in France, Israel, Greece, Cyprus and India. A diminutive striker with an exceptional turn of pace, Addo's ability to score goals and demoralise the opposition has led to him earning the nickname "baby-faced assassin". Holding the record of overall top scorer in the history of the Ghanaian League (22 goals in a single season), he is considered to be one of the most talented strikers ever to grace the competition. At some point during his career, Addo was named in FIFA's top 100 prospects.

Club career
Addo started his professional football career at Ghana's Hearts of Oak in 1998, where he remained for four seasons, in three of which he finished the country's top scorer. During his spell with the club, he won the 2000 CAF Champions League and 2001 Super Cup, four Ghanaian League championships (1997–98, 1999, 2000, 2001) and two Ghanaian FA Cups (1999, 2000). In his final playing year with Hearts of Oak, Addo broke the Ghanaian League season top-scorer record with 22 goals, thus helping his side win the league and cup double. During that same season, he scored two late, controversial goals for Hearts of Oak to defeat arch-rivals Asante Kotoko 2–1, in a match that was marred by the worst stadium disaster ever to take place in Africa.

After an unsuccessful loan spell at French club SC Bastia, Addo was signed by Israeli side Maccabi Netanya during the summer of 2002. He opened his account for his new club with a hat-trick in a cup game in his second start, and ended up scoring eight goals in 19 league appearances in his debut season. His second season with Maccabi Netanya did not go as smoothly, as he struggled to find the net during a difficult season for the club. His eventual tally of five goals were not enough to save the club from relegation. Addo had however already drawn the attention of Israeli club Maccabi Tel Aviv, joining the side in July 2004. He made an immediate impact at the start of the new season with a goal on his debut in a 2–1 win against Greek club PAOK during the 2004–05 UEFA Champions League third qualifying round. He went on to feature in all six UEFA Champions League group stage matches, without however scoring a goal.

After struggling to establish himself in the Maccabi Tel Aviv first team, Addo was loaned out to Greek Superleague club Ergotelis in January 2005 until the end of the season. He scored his only goal in 15 caps for the club on 20 February 2005, in a 2–1 victory over reigning champions Olympiacos. He then moved to Cyprus signing with Cypriot First Division side Enosis Neon Paralimni, but after spending yet another season struggling, he decided to return to Ghana and his first club Hearts of Oak in October 2006.

Addo spent the next two years at the Ghanaian League club adding one more Ghanaian League championship to his palmarès in 2007. He left Hearts of Oak in 2008 and signed with Indian top flight side East Bengal in 2008, joining compatriot Yusif Yakubu at the club. He was released from his contract at the end of the season in 2009, after failing to impress the club, who fielded him as a midfielder, despite the fact he had proven to be more efficient as a striker throughout his career.

After spending the next two years without a club, Addo had a short stint with newly promoted Ghanaian Premier League side Wassaman United. He left the eventually relegated club in 2011 and was once again unattached until January 2015, when he signed with second-tier Ghanaian club Eleven Wonders.

International career
Addo was a key member of the Ghanaian U-17 team that reached the FIFA U-17 World Championship semifinals in New Zealand. He won the golden boot award, scoring seven goals that helped Ghana to an impressive third-place finish.

Addo made his senior debut in July 2000 at the age of 17, also managing to score his first goal against Sierra Leone during the 2002 World Cup CAF qualification final round. He went on to have 9 appearances for the black stars.

International goals
Scores and results list Ghana's goal tally first, score column indicates score after each Addo goal.

Honours

Hearts of Oak
 Ghanaian League: 1999, 2000, 2001, 2002, 2007
 Ghanaian FA Cup: 1999, 2000
 CAF Champions League: 2000
 CAF Super Cup: 2001

Ghana
 FIFA World Youth Championship runners-up: 2001

Individual

 FIFA U-17 World Championship Golden Boot: 1999
 Ghanaian League top scorer: 1999, 2000, 2001

Records
 Most goals scored in a Ghanaian League season: 22 goals

References

External links
 

Living people
1982 births
Footballers from Accra
Ghanaian footballers
Association football forwards
Ghana international footballers
Ghana Premier League top scorers
Super League Greece players
Ligue 1 players
Israeli Premier League players
Accra Hearts of Oak S.C. players
SC Bastia players
Maccabi Tel Aviv F.C. players
Maccabi Netanya F.C. players
Enosis Neon Paralimni FC players
Ergotelis F.C. players
East Bengal Club players
Techiman Eleven Wonders FC players
2002 African Cup of Nations players
Ghanaian expatriate footballers
Expatriate footballers in Greece
Expatriate footballers in Israel
Expatriate footballers in Cyprus
Expatriate footballers in France
Ghanaian expatriate sportspeople in France
Ghanaian expatriate sportspeople in Israel
Ghanaian expatriate sportspeople in Cyprus
Ghanaian expatriate sportspeople in Greece